John Slaughter may refer to:

John Brooks Slaughter (born 1934), American engineer, Director of National Science Foundation, 1980–1982
John Bunyan Slaughter (1848-1928), American rancher and banker.
John Horton Slaughter (1841–1922), American lawman, Civil War soldier and gambler known as Texas John Slaughter
Texas John Slaughter (TV series) series on Wonderful World of Disney, 1958–1961
John Slaughter (MP), Member of Parliament (MP) for Gloucestershire

Slaughter, John